Marty Katz is a  motion picture and television producer.

In October 1992, following an eight-year association with The Walt Disney Studios that included the position as Executive Vice President, Motion Pictures and Television Production, he formed his own independent production banner, Marty Katz Productions, which was based at Disney and had an exclusive overall arrangement with the studio. Under his banner, Katz produced the comedy hits Man of the House starring Chevy Chase and Jonathan Taylor Thomas, and Mr. Wrong starring Ellen DeGeneres and Bill Pullman. Concurrently with this exclusive production agreement with Disney, he continued to serve the studio as a Production Consultant in connection with various film and television projects and new technology issues.

Katz joined The Walt Disney Studios in 1985 as Senior Vice President, Motion Picture and Television Production, and in that role was responsible for overseeing all aspects of physical production (including post production) for the studio's various production banners—Disney, Touchstone and Hollywood Pictures; all projects and series for Walt Disney Television; as well as productions for the Theme Parks and Feature Animation, among them the feature hits Down and Out in Beverly Hills, Outrageous Fortune, Good Morning, Vietnam, Three Men and a Baby, The Color of Money, Honey, I Shrunk the Kids, Dead Poets Society, Dick Tracy, Who Framed Roger Rabbit, Pretty Woman, Father of the Bride, The Rocketeer, The Little Mermaid, The Nightmare Before Christmas, and New York Stories. Three years later, he was promoted to the post of Executive Vice President and continued to oversee the physical production side of the studio's rapidly expanding motion picture and television slate.

Upon his return from Vietnam in 1969, where he served as a US Army 1st Lieutenant Combat Pictorial Unit Director, Katz began his industry career working for Roger Corman's New World Pictures as a Production Manager/Associate Producer on various low budget films. In 1971 he became Director of Film Production for ABC Circle Films during the Barry Diller/Michael Eisner years. During his five-year association with that organization, he supervised production for more than 50 television movies (including Eleanor and Franklin and Love Among the Ruins) which garnered a total of 25 Emmy Awards.

From 1976 to 1978, he was Executive Vice President of Quinn Martin Productions, supervising Streets of San Francisco, Barnaby Jones, and other on-air series and television films.  From 1978 to 1980, he was a Producer and Production Consultant for Paramount Pictures. Prior to joining Disney, Katz produced various television and theatrical films including Fox's Heart Like a Wheel (1983), and Geffen/Warner Bros.’ Lost In America (1985).

In 1996, after leaving Disney, Marty Katz Productions began operating independently with offices in Santa Monica. In 1997 Katz was Twentieth Century Fox's Supervising Producer on James Cameron's Titanic. He produced Reindeer Games directed by John Frankenheimer, and starring Ben Affleck, Charlize Theron, and Gary Sinise, in 2000. He then produced Impostor, directed by Gary Fleder, and starring Gary Sinise and Madeline Stowe in 2001.

In 2001, he produced The Four Feathers, directed by Shekhar Kapur and starring Heath Ledger, Kate Hudson, and Wes Bentley. In 2004, he produced The Great Raid, an epic World War II, true-life action drama about the liberation of American Survivors of the Bataan Death March from the Japanese Cabanatuan POW Camp in the Philippines in 1945. The film was directed by John Dahl (The Last Seduction, Rounders), and stars Benjamin Bratt, James Franco, Connie Nielsen, and Joe Fiennes for Miramax films.

In addition, he was a Production Consultant for Miramax on Lord of the Rings, (2000) and was instrumental in getting it greenlit, as well Production Consultant on Gangs of New York (2002) and Cold Mountain (2002), and various other productions for other studios.

His latest production, Love Ranch, directed by Taylor Hackford, and starring Helen Mirren, Joe Pesci, and Gina Gershon, was released in June 2010. He is currently working on other projects in development through his Marty Katz Productions.

Select filmography

External links
 Official site 
 

Year of birth missing (living people)
Living people
American film producers
American television producers
American Cinema Editors